Zehneria is a genus of flowering plants – of vines in the cucumber and gourd family, Cucurbitaceae. It contains about 35 species ranging from Africa, through Southeast Asia to Australia and Oceania.  The name honours botanical artist Joseph Zehner.

Description
Zehneria species are either monoecious or dioecious, annual or perennial, climbing vines.  Their leaves are simple, dentate and usually palmately lobed.  Inflorescences grow on axillary racemes, with the flowers normally clustered, occasionally solitary.  The fruit is fleshy, usually globose or ellipsoidal, and indehiscent.  The seeds are obovate, compressed and smooth.

Selected species
 Zehneria alba Ridl. 
 Zehneria baueriana  Endl. 
 Zehneria bodinieri  (H. Lév.) W. J. de Wilde & Duyfjes 
 Zehneria brevirostris  W. J. de Wilde & Duyfjes 
 Zehneria capillacea  (Schumacher & Thonning) Jeffrey 
 Zehneria cunninghamii  F.Muell. 
 Zehneria ejecta  F. M. Bailey 
 Zehneria hermaphrodita  W. J. de Wilde & Duyfjes 
 Zehneria indica  (Lour.) Keraudren
 Zehneria japonica  (Thunb.) H. Y. Liu 
 Zehneria marginata  (Blume) Keraudren 
 Zehneria marlothii  (Cogn.) R. Fern. & A. Fern.
 Zehneria maysorensis  Wight. & Arn.
 Zehneria microsperma  Hook. f. 
 Zehneria minutiflora  (Cogn.) C. Jeffrey 
 Zehneria mucronata  (Blume) Miq.
 Zehneria repanda  (Blume) Simmons 
 Zehneria scabra  (L.f.) Sond. 
 Zehneria scabrella  F. Muell. 
 Zehneria sphaerosperma  W. J. de Wilde & Duyfjes 
 Zehneria tenuispica  W. J. de Wilde & Duyfjes 
 Zehneria thwaitesii  (Schweinf.) C. Jeffrey 
 Zehneria wallichii  (C. B. Clarke) C. Jeffrey

Gallery

References

Notes

Sources
 
 
 

 
Cucurbitaceae genera